Supermarine Seagull may refer to one of the following types of amphibious aircraft produced by Supermarine:

 Supermarine Seagull (1921)
 Supermarine Seagull V (original name for the Supermarine Walrus)
 Supermarine Seagull (1948)